A closed city or closed town is a settlement where travel or residency restrictions are applied so that specific authorization is required to visit or remain overnight. Such places may be sensitive military establishments or secret research installations that require much more space or internal freedom than is available in a conventional military base. There may also be a wider variety of permanent residents, including close family members of workers or trusted traders who are not directly connected with clandestine purposes.

Many closed cities existed in the Soviet Union from the mid-1940s until its dissolution in 1991. After 1991, a number of them still existed in the CIS countries, especially in Russia. In modern Russia, such places are officially known as "closed administrative-territorial formations" (zakrytye administrativno-territorial'nye obrazovaniya, or  ZATO for short).

Structure and operations

Sometimes closed cities may only be represented on classified maps that are not available to the general public. In some cases there may be no road signs or directions to closed cities, and they are usually omitted from railroad time tables and bus routes.

Sometimes closed cities may be indicated obliquely as a nearby insignificant village, with the name of the stop serving the closed city made equivocal or misleading. For mail delivery, a closed city is usually named as the nearest large city and a special postcode, for example, Arzamas‑16, Chelyabinsk‑65. People not living in a closed city were subject to document checks and security checkpoints, and explicit permission was required for them to visit. To relocate to a closed city, one would need security clearance by the organization running it, such as the KGB in Soviet closed cities.

Closed cities were sometimes guarded by a security perimeter with barbed wire and towers. The very fact of such a city's existence was often classified, and residents were expected not to divulge their place of residence to outsiders. This lack of freedom was often compensated by better housing conditions and a better choice of goods in retail trade than elsewhere in the country. Also, in the Soviet Union, people working with classified information received a salary bonus.

Soviet-era

Closed cities were established in the Soviet Union from the late 1940s onwards under the euphemistic name of "post boxes", referring to the practice of addressing post to them via mailboxes in other cities. They fell into two distinct categories.

 The first category comprised relatively small communities with sensitive military, industrial, or scientific facilities such as arms plants or nuclear research sites. Examples are the modern towns of Ozyorsk (Chelyabinsk-65) with a plutonium production plant, and Sillamäe, the site of a uranium enrichment facility. Even Soviet citizens were not allowed access to these places without proper authorization. In addition to this, some bigger cities were closed for unauthorized access to foreigners, while they were freely accessible to Soviet citizens. These included cities like Perm, a center for Soviet artillery, munitions, and also aircraft engines production, and Vladivostok, the headquarters and primary base of the Soviet Pacific Fleet.
 The second category consisted of border cities (and some whole border areas, such as the Kaliningrad Oblast, Saaremaa, and Hiiumaa), which were closed for security purposes. Comparable closed areas existed elsewhere in the Eastern bloc; a substantial area along the inner German border and the border between West Germany and Czechoslovakia was placed under similar restrictions (although by the 1970s foreigners could cross the latter by train). Citizens were required to have special permits to enter such areas.

The locations of the first category of closed cities were chosen for their geographical characteristics. They were often established in remote places deep in the Urals and Siberia, out of reach of enemy bombers. They were built close to rivers and lakes that were used to provide the large amounts of water needed for heavy industry and nuclear technology. Existing civilian settlements in the vicinity were often used as sources of construction labour. Although the closure of cities originated as a strictly temporary measure that was to be normalized under more favorable conditions, in practice the closed cities took on a life of their own and became a notable institutional feature of the Soviet system.

Any movement to and from closed areas was tightly controlled. Foreigners were prohibited from entering them and local citizens were under stringent restrictions. They had to have special permission to travel there or leave, and anyone seeking residency was required to undergo vetting by the NKVD and its successor agencies. Access to some closed cities was physically enforced by surrounding them with barbed wire fences monitored by armed guards.

Mailbox
"Mailbox" was the unofficial name of a secret Soviet facility much like the closed city, but smaller, usually the size of a factory. The "mailbox" name was usually classified, as were the activities there. Incoming mail was addressed to "Mailbox #XXXX", thus the name of "mailbox". Most Soviet design bureaus (OKB) for weapons, aircraft, space technology, military electronics, etc. were "mailboxes".

Post-Soviet

Russia

Russia has the largest number of closed cities. The policy of closing cities underwent major changes in the late 1980s and early 1990s. The adoption of a new constitution for the Russian Federation in 1993 prompted significant reforms to the status of closed cities, which were renamed "closed administrative-territorial formations" (or ZATO, after the Russian acronym). Municipally all such entities have a status of urban okrugs, as mandated by the federal law.

There are currently 44 publicly acknowledged closed cities in Russia with a total population of about 1.5 million people. 75% are administered by the Russian Ministry of Defense, with the rest being administered by Rosatom. Another 15 or so closed cities are believed to exist, but their names and locations have not been publicly disclosed by the Russian government.

Some Russian closed cities are open for foreign investment, but foreigners may only enter with a permit. An example is the Nuclear Cities Initiative (NCI), a joint effort of the United States National Nuclear Security Administration and Minatom, which involves in part the cities of Sarov, Snezhinsk, and Zheleznogorsk.

The number of closed cities has been significantly reduced since the mid-1990s. However, on 30 October 2001, foreign travel (without any exceptions) was restricted in the northern cities of Norilsk, Talnakh, Kayerkan, Dudinka, and Igarka. Russian and Belarusian citizens visiting these cities are not required to have any permits; however, local courts are known to deport Belarusian citizens.

Krasnoyarsk-26 in Siberia, researched for the subject of Sidney Sheldon's 2001 fictional murder mystery-romance The Sky is Falling, was planned in 2003 to be shut down by 2011, in co-operation with the U.S, and documented by their Natural Resources Defense Council, but actually closed in 2008.

The number of closed cities in Russia is defined by government decree (see links further). They include the following cities. Reasons for restrictions are denoted in the descriptions below.

Altai Krai
Sibirsky

Amur Oblast
 Uglegorskformerly known as Svobodny-18, site of the second Russian trial cosmodrome of the Ministry of Defense of the Russian Federation, also called Svobodny Cosmodrome.

Arkhangelsk Oblast
Mirnyysite of Plesetsk Cosmodrome.

Astrakhan Oblast
Znamenskformerly known as Kapustin Yar-1, home to the Kapustin Yar (air base) and the "4th Missile Test Range".

Republic of Bashkortostan
Mezhgoryeformerly known as Ufa-105 and Beloretsk-15, home to the 129th Directorate of strategic subjects' technical supply and maintenance.

Chelyabinsk Oblast

Lokomotivny
Magnitogorsk
Ozyorskformerly known as Chelyabinsk-65 and Chelyabinsk-40, nuclear material processing and recycling plant.
Snezhinskformerly known as Chelyabinsk-70, site of one of the two major Russian Federal Nuclear Centers.
Tryokhgornyformerly known as Zlatoust-36, site of development of parts and machinery for atomic stations and weaponry.

Kamchatka Krai
Vilyuchinskformerly known as Petropavlovsk-Kamchatsky-50, base of a squadron of submarines from the Russian Pacific Fleet, also involved in the production of nuclear submarines.

Kirov Oblast
Pervomayskyformerly known as Yurya-2.

Krasnoyarsk Krai
Dikson
Solnechnyformerly known as Uzhur-4.
Zelenogorskformerly known as Krasnoyarsk-45.
Zheleznogorskformerly known as Krasnoyarsk-26.

Moscow Oblast
Krasnoznamenskformerly known as Golitsyno-2.
Molodyozhnyformerly known as Naro-Fominsk-5.
Vlasikhaformerly known as Gorky-2.
Voskhodformerly known as Novopetrovsk-2.
Zvyozdny gorodokformerly known as Shchyolkovo-14.

Murmansk Oblast

Alexandrovskclosed administrative-territorial formation, includes the towns of Gadzhiyevo, Polyarny, and Snezhnogorsk
Ostrovnoy
Severomorsk
Snezhnogorsk
Vidyayevo
Zaozyorsk

Nizhny Novgorod Oblast

Sarovformerly known as Arzamas-16

Orenburg Oblast
Komarovsky

Penza Oblast
Zarechnyformerly known as Penza-19

Perm Krai

Zvyozdnyformerly known as Perm-76.

Primorsky Krai
Fokinoformerly known as Shkotovo-17.

Pskov Oblast
Smuravyevo

Saratov Oblast
Mikhaylovsky
Shikhany
Svetly

Sverdlovsk Oblast
Lesnoyformerly known as Sverdlovsk-45
Novouralskformerly known as Sverdlovsk-44
Svobodny
Uralsky

Tomsk Oblast

Severskformerly known as Tomsk-7

Tver Oblast
Ozyorny
Solnechny

Vladimir Oblast
Raduzhny

Zabaykalsky Krai
Gornyformerly known as Chita-46.

Restricted territories
There is a list of territories within Russia that do not have closed-city status but require special permits for foreigners to visit. The largest locality within such territory is the city of Norilsk.

Azerbaijan
Agdam District, Azerbaijan

Estonia
There were two closed cities in Estonia: Sillamäe and Paldiski. As with all the other industrial cities, the population of them was mainly Russian-speaking. Sillamäe was the site for a chemical factory that produced fuel rods and nuclear materials for the Soviet nuclear power plants and nuclear weapon facilities, while Paldiski was home to a Soviet Navy nuclear submarine training centre. Sillamäe was closed until Estonia regained its independence in 1991; Paldiski remained closed until 1994, when the last Russian warship left.

Tartu, home to Raadi Airfield, was partially closed. Foreign academics could visit the University of Tartu, but had to sleep elsewhere.

Kazakhstan

Baikonur, a town close to the spaceport facility of the same name in Kazakhstan, which is rented and administered by Russia. Non-resident visitors will need pre-approval from the Russian authorities to visit both the town of Baikonur itself and the Cosmodrome. Note that said approval is completely separate from just having a Russian visa. Some tourism organisations in Kazakhstan provide services in organising trips to visit Baikonur and the museums contained there.
Priozersk, Kazakhstan
Kurchatov, Kazakhstana former closed city that known by its postal code, Semipalatinsk-21.

Kyrgyzstan
Mailuu-Suu, Jalal-Abad Region, a formerly closed uranium mining town, once known as "Mailbox 200".

Moldova
Moldova has one partially closed city: the village of Cobasna (Rîbnița District), which is under the control of the unrecognized state of Transnistria internationally recognized as part of Moldova. The village, on the left bank of the Dniester river, contains a large Soviet-era ammunition depot guarded by Russian troops. Only the Transnistrian and Russian authorities have detailed information about this depot.

Ukraine
Ukraine had eighteen closed cities.
Dniproformer closed city, a major center of Soviet aerospace industry.
Simferopol-28, Crimeaformer closed town, a Soviet military space mission control center.
Kamianskeformer closed city, largest Uranium processing factory in former Soviet Union.
Feodosia-13, Crimeaformer closed town, a central storage of nuclear weapons.

Other countries

Albania
During the period of communist rule in Albania, the towns of Çorovodë and Qyteti Stalin (now Kuçovë) were closed cities with a military airport, military industry and other critical war infrastructure.

Australia
Arnhem Land is a historical region of the Northern Territory of Australia which requires permits for access to non-Aboriginal individuals beyond public roads.

China 
 No. 404 Factory of China National Nuclear Corporation (中国核工业总公司第四零四厂), then the Ministry of Nuclear Industry, in the Gobi desert in the western part of Gansu, is a closed town often called the nuclear town (核城). It is the biggest nuclear industry base in China and it was built in 1958. China built its first military nuclear reactor there and 80% of the core parts for China's nuclear bombs were produced there. Until the 1980s, the whole town was closed to outsiders. A nuclear accident happened in 1969, involving a leak. The name "mine area of Gansu" (甘肃矿区) was used for secrecy. In 2007, most residents were moved to nearby Jiayuguan City.
Some remote areas in China, such as Datong Hui and Tu Autonomous County (except Laoye Mountain), Huangzhong County (except Kumbum Monastery), and Huangyuan County around Xining, the capital of Qinghai, maintain travel restrictions for foreigners. A foreigner must apply for an alien travel document (外国人旅行证) in advance, and report their accommodation to local police within 24 hours after entering the area. Similarly, all foreign visitors to the Tibet Autonomous Region must be part of a tour group to be permitted access.

Germany 
 Riems, Germany, an island in the Bay of Greifswald, is home to the oldest virological research institution in the world and is closed to the public. Quarantine stables and laboratories security are level 4. This means employees and visitors to the complex must change their clothes and shower when entering and exiting.

Hong Kong 

The Frontier Closed Area (FCA) is a fenced stretch of land along the northern border of Hong Kong, which serves as a buffer between the closed border and the rest of the territory. For anyone to enter the area, a Closed Area Permit is required. Between 1951 and 2012, it contained dozens of villages over an area of 28 square kilometres. Upon several stages of reduction, by 2016, the border town of Sha Tau Kok remains as the only settlement within the FCA.

Korea
Within the Korean Demilitarized Zone between North Korea and South Korea are two "peace villages" (one maintained by each nation): Daeseong-dong (South) and (possibly) Kijŏng-dong (North). Access by non-residents to Daeseong-dong requires a military escort, while Kijŏng-dong is not accessible to visitors.

North Korea
The Yongbyon Nuclear Scientific Research Center sits within a closed city that occupies 24.8 square kilometers (9.6 sq mi).

Mexico 
 In Baja California, the communities on Guadalupe Island (such as Campo Oeste) can be considered closed towns; because Guadalupe Island is within a Biosphere Reserve, the Mexican government requires special permits in order to visit the island.

Saudi Arabia 
 Mecca is closed to non-Muslims. Similar restrictions are in place for the city center of Medina.

South Africa 
 Alexander Bay, Northern Cape. After diamonds were discovered along this coast in 1925 by Hans Merensky, Alexander Bay became known for its mining activities. The town was a high-security area and permits were needed when entered. Today, it is no longer a high-security area and no permits are needed.

Sweden 
 Fårö and the northernmost parts of Gotland were closed to foreign citizens until 1998.

United Kingdom
 Imber, England, has been closed since 1943 when its residents were evicted by the British Army, who continue to use the village as a training ground for urban warfare. While most of the village's buildings have been demolished and replaced for training purposes, the village church (St Giles') was kept intact and the village is occasionally opened to the public during holidays.
 Foulness Island contains two villages with permanent residences, but public right of way is limited to certain paths and access controlled by the Ministry of Defence. The site contains an active live firing range, as well as several inactive firing ranges and other structures as well as the site of the development and testing of the UK's first atomic weapons.

United States 

 Dugway, Utah, inside the Dugway Proving Ground.
 The Gold Coast Historic District in Richland, Washington, was a closed city during the Manhattan Project.
 Los Alamos, New Mexico, was a closed city during the Manhattan Project.
 Mercury, Nevada, is within the Nevada Test Site, the primary testing location of American nuclear devices from 1951 to 1992, currently called Nevada National Security Site, and is currently closed as part of this site.
 Oak Ridge, Tennessee, was a closed city during the Manhattan Project.
 Plum Island, New York, home of the Plum Island Animal Disease Center
Fort Irwin, California

Between 1957 and 1962, approximately one-third of the United States was closed to Soviet citizens. Only eight states were accessible in their entirety: Oregon, Wyoming, Utah, North Carolina, Arkansas, Vermont, Missouri, and Mississippi.

In popular culture
The 2020 film Tenet prominently features a fictional Soviet-era closed city in Siberia called Stalsk-12 in its storyline.

See also 
 Exclusion zone
 Internal passport
 Military town
 Naukograd (literally science city)
 Nuclear Cities Initiative
 Propiska in the Soviet Union

References

Further reading
 Bukharin, Oleg (September/October 1998). "Retooling Russia's Nuclear Cities". The Bulletin of the Atomic ScientistsEducational Foundation for Nuclear Science.

External links 

  Current list of (acknowledged) closed cities / areas, from the Russian Federation Administration website.
 Russia's closed cities are open and shut casearticle from Russia Journal. (Original source requires paid subscription .)
 National Nuclear Security Administration, U.S. Department of Energy website.
 "Secret Cities" (article), from www.globalsecurity.org.* Right to the city in former Soviet Union closed cities (ZATO). Andrius Ropolas's paper focusing upon the social aspects of closed cites. Helpful bibliography.

Maps
 
  Closed cities map

 
Geography of Russia
Military history of the Soviet Union
Society of Russia
Science and technology in Russia
Science and technology in the Soviet Union
Soviet phraseology